The San Francisco Giants are a Major League Baseball (MLB) franchise based in San Francisco, California. The team was originally formed in 1883 as the New York Gothams, then the club was renamed the New York Giants in 1885. 75 years later, in 1958, the franchise moved to its current day city, San Francisco. Through the 2017 season, the Giants have played 20,528 games, winning 11,015, and losing 9,513 for a winning percentage of approximately .537. This list documents the superlative records and accomplishments of team members during their tenures as Gothams or Giants.

Table key

Regular season

Individual career records

Individual single-season records

Individual single-game records

Team all-time records
Source:

Team single-season records
Batting statistics; pitching statistics

Team single-game records
From 1901 onwards:

Postseason
 Consecutive postseason series wins - 11 (tie for MLB record with 1998-2001 Yankees) 
 Consecutive game wins when facing post-season elimination - 9 (MLB record)

See also
Baseball statistics

References

External links

Records
Major League Baseball team records